Shapley 1 (Sp 1 or PLN 329+2.1)  is an annular planetary nebula in the constellation of Norma with a magnitude of +12.6. As viewed from Earth, it is peculiar in that it seems to be a non-bipolar, torus-shaped planetary nebula. However, it is thought that this is due to the viewpoint of looking directly down on a binary system whose orbit is perpendicular to Earth.

Discovered in 1936 by Harlow Shapley, it is approximately 4900 light years from Earth, and is around 8700 years old. At the center of the nebula is a magnitude 14 white dwarf star. It has an angular diameter of 1.1 arc minutes,  which makes it about one-third (.32) of a light year across.

References

Norma (constellation)
Planetary nebulae